Sukeyuki Ban (伴 資健 Ban Sukeyuki, born Dec. 31, 1835 - died Jan. 28, 1913) was twice the mayor of Hiroshima in 1889-1895 and 1896–1906.

Mayors of Hiroshima
1835 births
1913 deaths